Peach is a surname.  Notable people with the name include:

 Alan Peach (1890–1961), English cricketer
 Ben Peach (1842–1926), British geologist and Charles William Peach's son
 Bill Peach, Australian television journalist
 Blair Peach (1946–1979), New Zealand-born teacher and political activist
 Bob Peach (born 1937), English cricketer
 Calvin Peach, Canadian former politician
 Ceri Peach (1939–2018), Welsh geographer
 Charles William Peach (1800–1886), British naturalist and geologist
 Daryl Peach, English professional pocket billiards player
 David Peach (born 1951), footballer on England's national team in 1977
 Harry Peach (1874–1936), British furniture manufacturer and social campaigner
 Kenneth Peach (1903–1988), American cinematographer
 L. du Garde Peach, English author and playwright
 Len Peach (1932–2016), British businessman and public servant
 Mary Peach (born 1934), British actress
 Norm Peach, American bassist
 Richard Peach, Australian news anchor
 Stuart Peach (born 1956), RAF Officer
 Terry Peach, American farmer and politician
 William Peach, English cricketer